is a member of Komeito serving in the Japanese House of Representatives, a position that he has been elected to twice. , he is also serving as the Vice-Minister for Foreign Affairs. He is an alumnus of Waseda University.

References

1970 births
Living people
Japanese politicians
Members of the House of Representatives (Japan)